This list includes Fleet Commanders (Turkish: Donanma Komutanı) of the Ottoman Navy.

On March 13, 1867, the title of Kapudan Pasha (list) was abolished, and the Naval Minister (Bahriye Nazırı) and the Fleet Commander (Donanma Komutanı) were instituted.

|-
! colspan=7| Ottoman Navy Fleet Commanders (1877-1920)

|-
! colspan=7| Turkish Navy Fleet Commanders (1922-1924)

Sources

External links 
 Türk Denizci Kıyafet ve Unvanları (1390-1923)

 
Ottoman Navy lists
Ottoman Empire
Fleet Commanders